The Toledo Pride were an American indoor soccer team based in Toledo, Ohio. They played only one season (1986–1987) in the American Indoor Soccer Association. They qualified for the playoffs but lost in the first round. The Pride's average home attendances was 1,862.

Year-by-year

Ownership
 Edward Cochran 
 Robert Ransom
 John Glase
 Frank DeJulius
 Joshua Gotlieb

Staff
 Edward Cochran – President
 Klaas de Boer – Head coach / General manager
 Mike Garrett – Assistant coach
 Patrick Jennings – Flexibility coordinator

1986–1987 Roster
 Cliff Brown 
 Bob DiNunzio
 Mike Garrett
 Dave Masur
 Jimmy McGeough, Jr.
 Ted Powers
 Neil Ridgway
 Carlos Salguero
  Lesh Shkreli
  Mark Jackson 
  John Rudovic
 Juan Vega
 Miguel Garcia

References

Sports teams in Toledo, Ohio
Soccer clubs in Ohio